Peter Wipf is the distinguished university professor of chemistry at the University of Pittsburgh. His research interests focus on the total synthesis of natural products, the discovery of new transformations of strained molecules, and the development of new pharmaceuticals. He is a Fellow of the Royal Society of Chemistry (RSC), the American Association for the Advancement of Science (AAAS), and the American Chemical Society (ACS).

Education
 Dipl. Chem., University of Zurich, Switzerland, 1984
 Ph.D., University of Zurich, Switzerland, 1987
 Postdoctoral Fellow, University of Virginia, 1990

Career
Wipf joined the University of Pittsburgh Department of Chemistry in 1990, and has remained there ever since. He became a full professor in 1997, and a distinguished university professor of chemistry in 2004. In 2001, he was appointed professor of pharmaceutical sciences in the School of Pharmacy. He is director of the university's Center for Chemical Methodologies & Library Development. He has been an adjunct professor at Duke University's Department of Chemistry since 2002.

His research interests encompass synthetic organic and medicinal chemistry, with a focus on natural products, the chemistry of strained molecules, and the discovery of new drugs.  He serves on many advisory and editorial boards in the fields of chemistry and pharmaceuticals.

Publications
Wipf is the author or coauthor of over 600 academic publications and a named inventor on more than 50 granted patents. One hundred of his original research publications have been cited over 100 times in the literature, including:

Honors and awards
Among many other honors and awards, Dr. Wipf is a:
 Fellow of the American Chemical Society (2010)
 Ernest Guenther Award (2009)
 Fellow of the Royal Society of Chemistry (FRSC) (2004)
 Fellow of the American Association for the Advancement of Science (2002)

References

Year of birth missing (living people)
Living people
University of Pittsburgh faculty
21st-century American chemists